Straight Clean & Simple was a Canadian country music group. They were nominated for Best Country Group or Duo at the Juno Awards in 1992 and 1993. Their 1994 single "Hillbilly Jane" reached the Top 20 of the RPM Country Tracks chart.

Discography

Albums

Singles

References

Canadian country music groups